Richard Joseph Coady Jr. (born December 17, 1944) is a former American football center and tight end in the National Football League. He was drafted by the Chicago Bears in the 11th round of the 1968 NFL Draft. He played college football at Memphis. His son Rich Coady also played in the NFL.

References

 
1944 births
Living people
Players of American football from Chicago
American football centers
American football tight ends
Memphis Tigers football players
Chicago Bears players